Luigi Preti (23 October 1914 – 19 January 2009) was an Italian politician and member of the Italian Democratic Socialist Party.

Biography
Preti was born in Ferrara. He graduated in law from the University Ferrara and subsequently in Literature from the University of Bologna.

After completing his studies, he taught history and philosophy in some high schools, and later became a professor of Institutions of Public Law at the University of Ferrara. The didactic activity was alternated with that of journalist and author of historical and legal publications. Preti did not hide his socialist ideas and when, in 1941, he was called to arms, he was denounced to the military court for "lese majesty, defeatism and insubordination". Held in a military prison awaiting trial, he managed to escape the death sentence, thanks to the fall of the regime and the subsequent armistice.

After working in Milan, Preti moved to Switzerland where, in Zurich, he came into contact with Ignazio Silone, who entrusted him with the direction of the periodical "The future of workers".

Returning to Italy at the end of the conflict, in 1946 he was elected provincial secretary of the Italian Socialist Party in Ferrara, and was elected to the municipal council. In June of the same year he was elected deputy to the Constituent Assembly, collecting as many as 20.516 preference votes.

On 12 January 1947 Preti joined the Italian Socialist Workers' Party (later known as the Italian Democratic Socialist Party, or PSDI), of which he was President from 1988 to 1992 and Honorary President from 1992 to 1994.

He was Deputy from 1946 to 1987; he also served as Minister of Finance, for International trade, for Budget, for Public Administration and for Transport.

In 1995 Preti left the PSDI and founded (together with Enrico Ferri) the European Liberal Social Democracy party (SOLE). Opposed to Ferri's decision to bring the SOLE into the Christian Democratic Centre, Preti left the party to found the Movement of Social Democratic Rebirth.

He died in 2009 at the age of 94.

References

External links

1914 births
2009 deaths
Politicians from Ferrara
Finance ministers of Italy
Government ministers of Italy
Italian Socialist Party politicians
Italian Democratic Socialist Party politicians
20th-century Italian lawyers
Bancarella Prize winners
University of Ferrara alumni
University of Bologna alumni
Transport ministers of Italy